Ananta is a mountain in the Vilcanota mountain range in the Andes of Peru, about  high. It is located in the Cusco Region, Quispicanchi Province, Marcapata District. It lies northeast of the higher peak of Pajo Ananta.

The river Pucamayu (possibly from Quechua for "red river") which downstream is named Sayapata originates west of Ananta. It flows to the northwest.

References

Mountains of Cusco Region
Mountains of Peru